Eupsophus insularis is a critically endangered species of frog in the family Alsodidae. It is endemic to Mocha Island in Chile, where found in temperate mixed forest. It is threatened by habitat loss.

References

Eupsophus
Amphibians of Chile
Endemic fauna of Chile
Amphibians of Patagonia
Taxonomy articles created by Polbot
Amphibians described in 1902